"Everything Zen" is a single by British grunge band Bush. Released on 28 January 1995, it was the band's first single released under the name "Bush", and their second overall. The single comes from their 1994 debut album, Sixteen Stone.

Lyrics
The title of the song may reference the poem Howl by Allen Ginsberg which includes the phrase "who vanished into nowhere Zen New Jersey." The lyrics "Mickey Mouse has grown up a cow" are taken from David Bowie's 1971 song "Life on Mars?". Other references in the song include Tom Waits ("Rain Dogs howl for the century"), Jane's Addiction's "Ted, Just Admit It..." ("there's no sex in your violence"), Alice in Chains' "Would?" ("try to see it once my way"), and the Elvis Presley sighting conspiracy theory ("I don't believe that Elvis is dead").

Music video
The video was the first video Bush had ever made. The video was directed by Matt Mahurin, who also makes an appearance in the video wearing a mask, and was shot on 12 and 13 November 1994. Scenes from the video were recreated in the opening credits of the TV series Millennium.

Gavin Rossdale said of the video: "I hadn't even seen that many videos before making this because I never had MTV. I just remember that it felt weird miming with all those people standing around, but you soon get over that. Obviously, this video was hugely important in breaking us in America."

Commercial performance
Although it did not achieve immediate success, it eventually reached number two on the Billboard Modern Rock Chart, number 5 on the Mainstream Rock Tracks and Canadian Rock/Alternative chart, and number 40 on the Hot 100 Airplay. It failed to hit the Hot 100 that year.

Track listing
European CD single (6544-95794-2) and 12-inch vinyl (A8196T)
 "Everything Zen" (radio edit)
 "Bud"
 "Monkey"
 "Everything Zen"

Charts

References

1994 songs
1995 debut singles
Bush (British band) songs
Song recordings produced by Alan Winstanley
Song recordings produced by Clive Langer
Songs written by Gavin Rossdale
Interscope Records singles
Trauma Records singles